The Estádio Nacional (English: National Stadium), also known as National Stadium Sports Complex and as Jamor Sports Complex, is a national football stadium used by the Portugal national team and by Belenenses SAD since 2018. It is located in the civil parish of Algés, Linda-a-Velha e Cruz Quebrada-Dafundo, in the municipality of Oeiras, in the southwestern part of Lisbon District.

The stadium entered UEFA history as host of the first ever game played in UEFA club competitions. The game was played on 4 September 1955 between Primeira Divisão's third-placed team, Sporting CP, and the Yugoslav champions, Serbian side Partizan Belgrade. It ended as a 3–3 draw and was the first game to be played of the first edition of the European Cup.

History
In 1933, the decision was made to construct the national stadium alongside the Jamor ravine. The original design was authored by Francisco Caldeira Cabral and Konrad Weisner and Jacobetty Rosa, with works beginning in 1939.

It was inaugurated on 10 June 1944 (Portugal Day) by the Council president António Oliveira Salazar.

Work was complete in the Quinta da Graça (in 1953), to install the Comissão Administrativa do Estádio Nacional (National Stadium Administrative Commission).

In 1961, construction on the hippodrome began, in addition to the first phase of work on the shooting range, by the Serviços de Construção e de Conservação (Construction and Conservation Services).

The Plano de Ordenamento do Complexo Desportivo da Jamor (Jamor Sports Complex Development Plan) was issued on July 1982, ordered by the DGEMN Direção-Geral de Edifícios e Monumentos Nacionais (Directorate-General for Buildings and National Monuments), authored by the architects Vasco Croft (coordinator), Nuno Bártolo and Joaquim Cadima, and by the landscape firm Professor Caldeira Cabral, Associados, Estudos e Projectos, Ld. (under the direction of landscape architects Francisco Caldeira Cabral and agronomist engineer João Caldeira Cabral. During this phase, diagnostic studies were performed to reformulate and re-evaluate the strategic importance of the complex.

In May 1985, the study Estabelecimento de zona de protecção (to establish a protection zone) was ordered by the DGEMN, by architects Vasco Croft and Nuno Bártolo, to limit the sports complex zone, providing a buffer for military access, a non aedificandi zone and urban growth, in addition to expansion for green spaces and support areas for nautical sports.

In 1993, a project to construct a sporting pavilion in Jamor was issued.

In September 2012, the Portuguese Football Federation announced that the stadium would undergo renovation in which work would begin in 2014.

It was announced by the Rugby governing body ERC on 2 September that the Portuguese team would hold their home games at the Estádio Nacional. However, all their home games were played at the Portuguese national rugby teams home stadium of Estádio Universitário de Lisboa.

On 6 February 2015, a tender was issued to cover the western edge of the audience seating for the rugby field.

Architecture
Architecturally the stadium is noteworthy for its open east side, unusual for a stadium otherwise featuring a typical oval configuration. Its current capacity is 39,000 and it is the venue for the Portuguese football cup final.

Sport

Football
The stadium has traditionally hosted the final of the Portuguese Cup (since 1946); in only five times was this game played in other venues and in total, 52 Cup finals have been played on the grounds. Portuguese football fans have bemoaned the historic stadium, owing to a lack of amenities; following the Euro 2004, there was a movement to move the event to one of the grounds built for the Euro football championships.

One memorable match was played here on 3 May 1949, when Benfica won 4-3 a testimonial to their captain Francisco Ferreira against Torino which turned out to be the last one played by the Grande Torino due to the Superga air disaster the following day.

The most prestigious international game ever staged at the Estádio Nacional was the 1967 European Cup Final, played between Celtic and Internazionale with the former winning 2-1 (becoming the first British European champion team, nicknamed the Lisbon Lions).

In addition to hosting the Portugal national team since 1945, the site has held 49 international events for Portugal.

Rugby
The Rugby governing body ERC announced on 2 September 2014 that the Portuguese club Lusitanos XV would hold their home games of the 2013-14 Amlin Challenge Cup at National Stadium. However, all their home games of the 2013-14 Amlin Challenge Cup were played at the Portuguese national rugby teams home stadium of Estádio Universitário de Lisboa.

Events
There have been notable concerts at the stadium, including The Police on 25 September 2007, as part of their The Police Reunion Tour and the Black Eyed Peas on 30 May 2010, during their The E.N.D. World Tour. Iron Maiden are scheduled to play a post-pandemic show at the stadium on 31 July 2022, on the final date of their Legacy of the Beast Tour.

References

Notes

Bibliography

Football venues in Portugal
Rugby union stadiums in Portugal
National stadiums
Estadio Nacional
Sports venues in Lisbon District
Estadio Nacional
Sports venues completed in 1944
Sport in Oeiras, Portugal
Multi-purpose stadiums in Portugal